A razzia (from French razzia "incursion", and from Algerian Arabic ġaziya (غزية), "algara" or "raid") is a term used to refer to a surprise attack against an enemy settlement. Although it primarily sought to obtain booty, historically the objectives of a razzia have been diverse: the capture of slaves, ethnic or religious cleansing, expansion of territory, and intimidation of the enemy.

One of the most representative razzias, because of its symbolic significance, was the sack of Rome in 410 by the Visigothic king Alaric I, whose repercussions echoed in future massive invasions in the following decades.

Over time, its meaning has also been extended to other activities that bear certain similarities to these attacks, such as police raids or certain violent incursions by organized or paramilitary groups, such as those carried out in Brazilian favelas, or in refugee camps during the war in Central Africa.

Today, in the Turkish language the term means "war veteran".

Etymology 
Ghazw or ghazah (plural ghazawa-t) (Arabic: غزو) is an originally Arabic term meaning "battle", generally used in the context of a battle for the cause of Allah. It comes from the triconsonantal root g.z.w. ("to attack"). It has the same connotation as the words ghaziya and maghazi, which in pre-Islamic times referred to raids organized by nomadic Bedouin warriors for the purpose of plundering rival tribes or sedentary, wealthier neighbors. The plural ghazawat is used in some Islamic countries as a synonym for "judgment".

 The word ghazwa was originally applied to those battles in which Muhammad personally participated. Over time it has evolved to be associated with battles related to the expansion of Islam. The term ghazi or "Warrior of the Faith" was used to identify participants in such battles and is synonymous with the roots ghāziya and maghāzī.
 The word sirya (plural saraya or sariya) designates those battles that Muhammad arranged but in which he did not participate personally. By extension, it also applies to those mounted and reconnaissance raids that he organized but did not attend in person.
 The word ba'atha differed in size from saraya, and while it sometimes alluded to combat, it generally referred to expeditions or missions of a diplomatic nature (e.g. embassies or political dialogues).
 In Western European literature it is known by the name razzia, derived from the French word razzier (rezzou), which entered the French vocabulary after the colonization of Algeria, and which is no more than a transliteration of the colloquial Arabic word ghazya.
 In Medieval Hispania, the razzias were known by the name aceifa, from the Andalusian Arabic ṣáyfa, which in turn comes from the classical Arabic ṣā'ifah, with the meaning of "harvest" or "summer expedition".

Related terms. 

 akinji: "raider," a late synonym of ghāzī.
 al-'Awāsim: the Syrian-Anatolian border area between the Byzantine Empire and its successive opponents.
 ribāt: fortified convent used by a military order, especially in North Africa.
 uj: Turkish term meaning "mark"; uj begi ("Lord of the Mark") was a title assumed by early Turkish leaders, later replaced by serhadd (border).

The Aceifas 

In the Iberian Peninsula, the Muslim razzias received the name of aceifas, from the Arabic al-ṣayfa: "Saracen war expedition that takes place in summer".

The Arabic name ṣayfa is etymologically related to ṣayf (summer) and initially meant "harvest", but over time it was used as "military expedition", due to the "harvest" of goods in the plundering, and that it also used to be carried out in summer period.

The first important razzias against peninsular Christian territory began after the defeat of Bermudo I by the Andalusian Hisham I in the battle of Burbia (791), even sacking the city of Oviedo in 794.

The Moorish aceifas were interrupted with the ascent to the Asturian throne of Alfonso II the Chaste and the Christian victory in the battle of Lutos, giving rise in response to a series of Christian razzias, such as the one carried out in 798 against Lisbon.

Internal strife in the emirate of Cordoba interrupted the raids, at least intensively, until the accession to the throne of Abderraman II. After putting an end to his uncle Abdallah's pretensions to the throne and putting down a revolt in Murcia, he organized annual aceifas against the Christians (at their most intense, up to three were organized in the same year). Most were directed against Alava and, especially, Galicia, which was the most vulnerable region of the Kingdom of Asturias. Despite this, there was no lack of attacks against Ausona (Vich), Barcelona, Girona and even Narbonne in the expeditions of the years 828, 840 and 850.

In the Malikí law there was a precept on how the holy war was to be carried out:

This precept was fulfilled with zeal by Almanzor. In the year 981, when Hisham II delegated his powers to the warlord, who was named al-Mansūr bi-l-Lah ("The Victorious of God"), he organized up to five expeditions in Christian lands.

At his death, after the battle of Calatañazor (1002), Almanzor left a terrible legacy: up to 52 victorious military campaigns to the Christian kingdoms, of which the best known are the aceifas organized to Barcelona (985) and Santiago de Compostela (997), where according to legend he made Christian slaves carry the bells of the cathedral to Cordoba. But a large number of Christian monasteries such as San Millán de Suso, Portuguese cities, or the capitals of the Christian kingdoms of Pamplona and León, which he sacked up to four times, were not spared either.

During the Almoravid and Almohad domination, aceifas were directed both to Christian and Muslim territory. The Almoravids raided all of North Africa, reaching as far as Ghana. The fanaticism of these new invaders caused some Taifa kings to ally with the Christian kings of the north, also becoming targets of the summer aceifas.

The last important aceifas in peninsular territory would take place shortly after the battle of Alarcos, in 1198 to Madrid and in 1199 to Guadalajara. The battle of Las Navas de Tolosa (1212) would definitively ruin the Almohad military power. Al-Andalus would never again go on the offensive.

Raiders: the "Ghazi" 
Ghazi (Arabic: غازى) is an Arabic word in origin, derived from ghazā (contraction for *ghazawa) = "raided" or "waged war", adopted into other languages such as Turkish to designate those Muslims who have sworn to fight non-believers in the Islamic religion. In this sense, it is essentially equivalent to Mujahid: "one who wages jihad", commonly known as "holy war".

The ghāzī warrior dates back to at least the Sasanian period, when he appears as a mercenary and frontier fighter in Khorasan and Transoxiana. Subsequently, as many as 20,000 ghazi took part in the Indian campaigns of Mahmud of Gazni.

The ghāzī way of life was based on plunder, so in times of peace they engaged in banditry and sedition. They were organized into guilds that attracted adventurers, zealots, and political and religious dissidents of all ethnicities. Soldiers of Turkish descent predominated, especially after the acquisition of Mamluks, Turkish slaves, and guard corps of the caliphs and amirs for the ghāzī ranks. Some of them would climb to control positions of military and eventually political power in various Muslim states.

In the west, Turkish ghāzīs regularly raided along the Byzantine frontier, finding in the Greek and Armenian akritoi their nemesis. After the battle of Manzikert, these raids intensified, while the ghāzī guilds grouped together to form fraternities similar to Christian military orders. They adopted as their emblems the white cap and the club. The rise of the ghāzī organizations occurred during the Mongol conquest, as a result of which many fled to Anatolia from Persia and Turkestan.

The organization of these groups was fluid, reflecting their popular character. Ghāzī warriors could rise in the hierarchy by gaining prestige with a particular amir, similar to the condotiers of western mercenary bands. From the territory conquered in Anatolia during the ghazw emerged the Ottoman Empire. Tradition has it that its founder, Osman I, was a ghāzī who rose through the inspiration of Sheikh Ede Bali.

In a later period of Islamic history, the honorific title ghāzī was adopted by those Muslim leaders who showed some success in extending the frontiers of Islam, eventually this title became exclusive, similar to how the Roman title Imperator became the exclusive property of the supreme leader of the Roman state and his family.

The Ottomans were probably the first in this practice, so the institution of ghazw dates back to the beginnings of their state:

By the beginning of Ottoman rule, it had become a title of honor and synonymous with leadership. In a 1337 inscription (concerning the construction of the Bursa mosque), Orhan, second in the Ottoman dynasty, is described as "Sultan, son of the Sultan of the Gazis, Gazi son of Gazi, martial lord of the horizons." The Ottoman poet Ahmedi, circa 1402, defines a Gazi as:

The first nine Ottoman leaders used the word "Ghazi" as part of their title, and often their successors. It never became a formal title, unlike Sultan ul-Muyahidin, used by Sultan Murad Khan II KhojāGhazi, sixth ruler of the House of Osman (1421-1451), whose full title was 'Abu'l Hayrat, Sultan ul-Muyahidin, Khan of Khanes, Grand Sultan of Anatolia and Rumelia, and of the cities of Adrianople and Philopolis.

As a result of the political legitimacy granted to the one holding this title, Muslim leaders competed with each other for preeminence in the ghāziya. Generally, the Ottoman sultans were recognized for their excellence over the rest:

The term Ghazi was also used as an honorific title, usually translated as "the Victorious", by high-ranking officers, who distinguished themselves in the field against non-Muslim enemies; thus, it was awarded to General Osman Pasha after his successful defense of Plevna in Bulgaria. It was also assigned to Mustafa Kemal Ataturk, despite the fact that he was a secular politician.

Two Muslim leaders from Afghanistan and Hyderabad personally used the title Padshah-i-Ghazi.

Mode of execution of the razzias 

When executed in the context of Islamic jihad, the function of the razzia was to weaken the enemy's defenses in preparation for his eventual conquest and subjugation. Since the typical razia was not sufficiently numerous to achieve military or territorial objectives, it usually involved surprise attacks on poorly defended targets (e.g. villages) with the intention of terrorizing and demoralizing their inhabitants and destroying supplies that might supply the enemy. Islamic rules clearly defined who should go to war and who was exempted from such responsibility.

Although the rules of Islamic warfare forbade taking the lives of non-combatants such as women, monastics and serfs, it was possible to plunder or destroy their property and take them as slaves.

The only way to avoid the offensives of the ghāzīs was to submit to the Islamic state. In that case, non-Muslims enjoyed the status of dhimmi-s, living under its protection. Many Christian sources confuse these two phases in the Ottoman conquests. Faced with the terrible threat of the ghāzīs, the population in the confines of the Empire often renounced the ineffective protection of the Christian states, seeking refuge by defection to the Ottoman Empire. In this way, peasants living in the open countryside gained far more than they lost.

One of the main sources that tell us about the development of a traditional razzia are the medieval Islamic jurists, whose discussions of what was and was not permitted in such actions in the course of war reveal some of the practices of this institution. One of the most important is the Andalusian Averroes, in his work Bida-yat al-Mujtahid wa-Niha-yat al-Muqtasid.

The Maghāzī razzias in literature 
Maghāzī, literally meaning "campaigns", is a term often used in Islamic literature to represent the military campaigns conducted by the Prophet Muhammad following the Hijrah. The annals of these campaigns, often reflected as preemptive measures or attacks against invaders, which entailed the traditional plunder, constitute their own genre of prophetic biography within Islamic literature, distinctive of the sira. A famous example of this genre is al-Waqidi's Maghāzī.

Contemporary uses

World War II 

Some of these well-known razzias are the Night of the Long Knives or the Night of Broken Glass, carried out by the Gestapo in Germany. The SS raid on the Yugoslav city of Žabalj (present-day Serbia) and occupied Denmark is also known as such.

Chechnya 
During the Second Chechen War, Chechnya announced the gazawat against Russia, as a propaganda measure and to gain the support of the Islamic population, the majority in the country.

Other examples 
Other examples of current razzias are the death squad raids in the Brazilian favelas, or the paramilitary incursions during the war in Central Africa. The multiple attacks by Colombian guerrilla groups on Colombian army squads and vice versa could also be considered as such.

See also 

 Malón

Notes and References

Bibliography 

 RoyalArk- Ottoman Turkey
 
 
 
 
 
 Averroes, Bida-yat al-Mujtahid wa-Niha-yat al-Muqtasid

External links 

 F. Maillo. "La guerra santa según el derecho Malikí" (in Spanish). Biblioteca Gonzalo de Berceo.
 Dolors Bramon, "La batalla de Albesa: Nuevas aportaciones" (in Spanish). C.E.M.A.
 Cañada, Juste. "Nuevas propuestas para la identificación de topónimos e itinerarios en las campañas de Almanzor" (in Spanish). Dialnet.

Arabic words and phrases
French words and phrases
Islamic terminology
Military terminology
Military history
Battles of Muhammad